Kailia Lexis Posey (April 19, 2006 – May 2, 2022) was an American beauty pageant contestant and reality television personality best known for her appearance on the TLC show Toddlers and Tiaras.

Career 
Posey competed in child beauty pageants from the age of three until her death at 16. She was five years old when she appeared on the fourth season of Toddlers & Tiaras, during which she additionally became the subject of the "Grinning Girl" internet meme. Posey won the title of Miss Lynden Teen in 2021.

Death
On May 2, 2022, Posey was found dead at a park in Blaine, Washington. Her death was ruled a suicide by hanging.

Filmography

Film

Television

References

External links
 

2006 births
2022 deaths
2022 suicides
21st-century American actresses
American beauty pageant contestants
Actresses from Las Vegas
Actresses from Washington (state)
Suicides by hanging in Washington (state)